Szyguła or Schygulla is a Polish surname. Notable people with the surname include:

 Hanna Schygulla (born 1943), German actress and singer
 Witold Szyguła (1940–2003), Polish footballer and manager

Polish-language surnames